Pungankuzhi is a village in the Ariyalur taluk of Ariyalur district, Tamil Nadu, India.

Demographics 

 census, Pungankuzhi had a total population of 3208 with 1581 males and 1627 females.

References 

Villages in Ariyalur district